Van Le Ngoc (Lê Ngọc Vǎn) is a ballet dancer and a choreographer. Born in Hanoi, Vietnam, he moved to live and study in France in 1996. From 1996 to 1998, he followed his study to become a ballet dancer at National Superior Conservatory of Music and Dance in Lyon (CNSM). In September 1998, Van signed his first contract with the Ballet National de Marseille, under the direction of Marie-Claude Pietragalla, Etoile of the Paris Opera Ballet. Five years later in 2003, he left Ballet National de Marseille to join the English National Ballet in London.

Choreography repertoire
 2006 – "Without Words" Music by Yann Tiersan, English National Ballet choreographic workshop
 2007 – "Les Emotions" Music by Sakoto, commissioned by English National Ballet for Synergy Program
 2008 – "Duo" Music by Petru Guelfucci, Varna Ballet Competition
 2009 – "Concerto for Five" Music J.S Bach, English National Ballet choreographic workshop / Hanover Germany Choreography Competition
 2010 – "The Weight of Love" Music Stravinsky, world premier in Shanghai Expo Centre on 8 Sept, commissioned by English National Ballet in collaboration with Shanghai Ballet
 2011 – "Vue de l'Autre" Music by Ludovico Einaudi. New ballet commissioned by English National Ballet, world premier in London Coliseum Theatre on 16 March
 2011 – "Blackgold" Music by Armand Amar, English national ballet choreographic workshop
 2011 – "Chase" Music by Armand Amar, world premier on 11th sept 2011 at Britten Theatre, London
 English National Ballet – First artists

Dance repertoire

 Arlesienne, choreography by Roland Petit
 Alice in Wonderland, choreography by Derek Dean (Cat, Gryphon, Caterpillar)
 Aunnis, choreography by Jaques Garnier
 Acte, choreography by R. Seyfried
 Carmen, choreography by Roland Petit
 Cinderella, choreography by Michael Corder (Dancing Master, Princes friends, Spring)
 Concerto Violin, choreography by George Balanchine
 Concerto for Five, choreography V. Le Ngoc
 Coppellia, choreography by R. Hynd
 Dove la lune, choreography by J. Christophe Maillot
 Esplanade, choreography by Paul Taylor
 Etudes, choreography by H. Lander
 Fire Bird, choreography by Maurice Bejart
 Fleure d’autaune, choreography by M.C. Pietragalla
 Flower Festival, choreography by A. Bournonville
 Giselle, choreography by M.S keaping (peasant pas de 2)
 J’ai trouve l’idee plaisante, choreography by J.P. Aviotte
 La Sylphide, choreography by A. Bournonville (pas de 2)
 Les Emigrants, choreography by C. Brumachon
 Les Indomptes, choreography by C. Brumachon
 Melody on the Move, choreography by M. Corder
 Manon, choreography by MacMilan
 Men Y Men, choreography by W. Eagling
 Paquita, choreography by M.C. Pietragalla
 Perpertum Mobile, choreography by C. Hampson
 Raymonda, choreography by M.C. Pietragalla
 Resolution, choreography by W. Eagling (pas de 3)
 Romeo & Juliet, choreography by R. Nureyev
 Romeo & Juliet, choreography by V. Danzig
 Rubbies, choreography by George Balanchine
 Sakountala, choreography by M.C. Pietragalla
 Sans Mobile Apparent, choreography M. Naisy
 Scheherazade, choreography by M. Fokine
 Sinfonietta, choreography by C. Hampson
 Snow Queen, choreography by M. Corder (Reindeer, one of 4 male sprites)
 Stelt, choreography by Richard Wherlock
 Strictly Gershwin, choreography by D. Dean
 Suite en Blanc, choreography by Serge Lifar
 Swan Lake, choreography by D. Dean
 The Canterville Ghost, choreography by W. Turker
 The four temperaments, choreography by George Balanchine (phlegmatic)
 The Nutcracker, choreography by C. Hampson
 The Nutcracker, choreography by W. Eagling
 The Sleeping Beauty, choreography by K. Macmilan (Gold, Blue Bird, Cat)
 The Rite of Spring, choreography by K. Macmilan
 The Weight of Love, choreography V. Le Ngoc
 Tzigan, choreography by George Balanchine
 Vita, choreography by Marie-Claude Pietragalla
 Vue de l’autre, choreography V. Le Ngoc
 Who Cares?, choreography by George Balanchine.

References

Further reading
 
 
 
 
 
 Van Le Ngoc's Les Emotions
 Vue de l'autre review

English National Ballet dancers
Vietnamese dancers
Ballet choreographers
Living people
Vietnamese emigrants to France
Year of birth missing (living people)